Jerzy Przybylski (27 April 1923 – 24 July 1999) was a Polish actor. He made over 25 appearances in film and television. He starred in the 1986–1987 television series Zmiennicy.

References

External links
 

1923 births
1999 deaths
Polish male film actors
Actors from Lviv
20th-century Polish male actors